Mark Morrison (born March 11, 1963) is a Canadian former professional ice hockey player who played 10 games in the National Hockey League (NHL) with the New York Rangers. Morrison is currently the head coach of the Manitoba Moose of the American Hockey League (AHL). Mark is the brother of Doug Morrison who also played in the NHL. Their sister married fellow Canadian hockey player Garth Butcher.

Playing career
Morrison was a member of the Tulsa Oilers Central Hockey League (CHL) team that suspended operations on February 16, 1984, playing only road games for the final six weeks of the 1983-84 season. Despite this adversity, the team went on to win the league's championship.

In 1993, Morrison moved to Scotland to play with the Fife Flyers of the British Hockey League (BHL). He took over as Flyers coach midway through the 1995-96 season, winning various Player and Coach of the Year awards over the next 10 years.

Coaching
Morrison joined the Victoria Salmon Kings of the ECHL as an assistant coach in 2006, where he was eventually named the replacement for Tony MacAulay midway into the 2006-07 ECHL season. He assumed the titles of head coach and general manager at the start of the 2007-08 season and continued to hold that title until the Salmon Kings officially folded on May 7, 2011, when Morrison was effectively relieved of his duties and all of his players were considered to be unrestricted free agents.

On July 20, 2011, Morrison was announced as the assistant coach of the future St. John's IceCaps of the American Hockey League (AHL), the AHL affiliate of the Winnipeg Jets. He continued serving as an assistant coach when the franchise relocated back to Winnipeg as the Manitoba Moose in 2015.

Morrison was named an assistant coach with the Anaheim Ducks of the NHL on June 28, 2017.

After four seasons in Anaheim, he was re-hired by the Jets to be the head coach of the Manitoba Moose prior to the 2021–22 season.

Career statistics

Awards

Player
1980-81: George Parsons Trophy (Sportsmanship), Memorial Cup (Canadian Hockey League)
1983-84: Adams Cup winner, Tulsa Oilers, (Central Hockey League)

Coach
1996-97: Coach Of The Year, Northern Premier League, Fife Flyers
1999-00: Coach Of The Year, British National League, Fife Flyers
2003-04: Coach Of The Year, British National League, Fife Flyers

References

External links

1963 births
Canadian ice hockey centres
Delta Suns players
Fife Flyers players
Ice hockey people from British Columbia
Living people
Manitoba Moose coaches
New Haven Nighthawks players
New York Rangers draft picks
New York Rangers players
People from Delta, British Columbia
Tulsa Oilers (1964–1984) players
Victoria Cougars (WHL) players
Victoria Salmon Kings coaches
Anaheim Ducks coaches
Canadian expatriate ice hockey players in Italy
Canadian expatriate ice hockey players in Scotland
Canadian expatriate ice hockey players in the United States
Canadian ice hockey coaches
Canadian expatriate ice hockey players in Switzerland
Naturalised citizens of the United Kingdom